Romain Riboud (born 2 June 1982 in Albertville) is a French para-alpine skier. He represented France at four Winter Paralympics: in 2002, 2006, 2010 and 2014. In 2002 he won the silver medals in the Men's Giant Slalom LW3,5/7,9 and the Men's Super-G LW3,5/7,9 events.

See also 
 List of Paralympic medalists in alpine skiing

References

External links 
 
 

1982 births
Living people
Paralympic alpine skiers of France
Paralympic silver medalists for France
Paralympic medalists in alpine skiing
Alpine skiers at the 2002 Winter Paralympics
Alpine skiers at the 2006 Winter Paralympics
Alpine skiers at the 2010 Winter Paralympics
Alpine skiers at the 2014 Winter Paralympics
Medalists at the 2002 Winter Paralympics
Sportspeople from Albertville